1954 in philosophy

Events

Publications
 Ernst Bloch, The Principle of Hope (1954)

Philosophical fiction
 Iris Murdoch, Under the Net (1954)

Births
 May 8 - Kwame Anthony Appiah 
 November 28 - Julian Nida-Rümelin

Deaths
 June 7 - Alan Turing (born 1912)

References 

Philosophy
20th-century philosophy
Philosophy by year